Pilodeudorix kedassa is a butterfly in the family Lycaenidae first described by Hamilton Herbert Druce in 1910. It is found in Cameroon.

References

External links

Die Gross-Schmetterlinge der Erde 13: Die Afrikanischen Tagfalter. Plate XIII 66 b

Endemic fauna of Cameroon
Butterflies described in 1910
Deudorigini